Bunohyrax is an extinct genus of hyrax.

References

Prehistoric hyraxes
Fossil taxa described in 1910
Prehistoric placental genera